Ingrid of Sweden (Ingrid Victoria Sofia Louise Margareta; 28 March 1910 – 7 November 2000) was Queen of Denmark from 1947 until 1972 as the wife of King Frederick IX.

Born into the House of Bernadotte, she was the daughter of King Gustaf VI Adolf of Sweden and his first wife, Princess Margaret of Connaught. In 1935, she married Crown Prince Frederick of Denmark and they had three daughters: Margrethe, the current Queen of Denmark; Benedikte, now a Princess of Sayn-Wittgenstein-Berleburg; and Anne-Marie, the former Queen of the Hellenes.

In 1947, her husband became king on his father's death. As queen, Ingrid reformed the traditions of Danish court life, abolished many old-fashioned customs at court and created a more relaxed atmosphere at official receptions. King Frederick IX died in 1972, and Ingrid's daughter Margrethe became queen.

She was also a paternal aunt of the present Swedish monarch, King Carl XVI Gustaf.

Early life

Princess Ingrid was born on 28 March 1910, at the Royal Palace in Stockholm as the third child and only daughter of Gustaf Adolf, Crown Prince of Sweden and his first wife, Princess Margaret of Connaught. She was the first Royal Princess to be born to the House of Bernadotte in 80 years, the last Princess being Princess Eugénie of Sweden who was born in 1830 and died in 1889. Her father was the eldest son of King Gustaf V of Sweden by his wife, Princess Victoria of Baden. Her mother was a daughter of Queen Victoria's third son Prince Arthur, Duke of Connaught and Strathearn by his wife Princess Louise Margaret of Prussia.

She was baptised Ingrid Victoria Sofia Louise Margareta in Slottskyrkan (the Royal Chapel) in Stockholm, Sweden on 5 May 1910. Her godparents were: the King and Queen of Sweden (her paternal grandparents); the Dowager Queen of Sweden (her paternal great-grandmother); the Duke and Duchess of Connaught and Strathearn (her maternal grandparents); the Dowager Grand Duchess of Baden (her partenal great-grandmother); the Empress of Russia (her mother's paternal first cousin); Princess Alexander of Teck (her mother's paternal first cousin); the Prince of Wales (her mother's paternal first cousin); Prince Adalbert of Prussia (her maternal second cousin); the Grand Duchess of Baden; and the Dowager Duchess of Dalarna.

Ingrid and her family lived in apartments in the Royal Palace in Stockholm, in a mansion at Ulriksdal, near the capital, and in a summer residence, Sofiero Palace in Helsingborg, Scania in southern Sweden. Crown Princess Margaret founded a school for Ingrid with a small circle of Swedish noble girls. Ingrid was also given some domestic instruction as part of her education. As a child, she practiced cooking in her model cottage on the palace grounds and even washed the dishes after meals. The ability for a girl to cook, sew, and manage a household was seen as important at the time for royalty. In 1920, when Ingrid was just ten years old, her mother died from sepsis while in the eighth month of her sixth pregnancy. After her mother's death, Ingrid spent several months of each year in the United Kingdom in the care of her grandfather. Observers suggested that Ingrid's strong self-discipline was shaped as an effect of her mother's death. Her father remarried Lady Louise Mountbatten three years later. Louise was a second cousin of Ingrid's. Only a stillborn daughter resulted from her father's second marriage. Ingrid felt betrayed by her father when he remarried, and she was unkind to Crown Princess Louise. Ingrid and her father would not reconcile until many years later.

Ingrid was taught history, art history, political science, and learned several languages. Her knowledge of art and culture was extended by long stays in Paris and Rome. Along with her father, stepmother and brother Prince Bertil, Ingrid took a five-month journey through the Middle East in 1934 - 1935. Ingrid interested in sports, especially horse-riding, skiing and tennis. Ingrid made her debut at the opening of the Swedish Riksdag in 1928 when she was noted to be “smartly dressed.” She was also noted to be an accomplished linguist, horsewoman, skier and skater, and dancer. Ingrid often played tennis against her grandfather King Gustav V. During her young adulthood, Ingrid was often seen driving her two-seat car around Stockholm. Besides gaining a reputation as a stylish young woman, Ingrid was known as being quite attractive. After her visit to the United States in 1939, Americans described Ingrid as "tall and very slender" with a "nicely modeled mouth and exquisite teeth."

Marriage 

The question of Ingrid's marriage was a hot topic of conversation in the 1920s. She was matched with various foreign royalties and was seen by some as a possible wife for the heir-apparent to the British throne, the Prince of Wales, who was her second cousin. Her mother, Margaret of Connaught, and the then-Prince of Wales' father, King George V, were first cousins, both being grandchildren of Queen Victoria. In 1928, Ingrid met the Prince of Wales in London. However, no engagement took place. She was also considered as a match for Prince George of the United Kingdom, the fourth son of King George V. 

On 15 March 1935, shortly before her 25th birthday, she was engaged to Frederick, Crown Prince of Denmark and Iceland. They were related in several ways. As descendants of Oscar I of Sweden, they were third cousins. Through Leopold, Grand Duke of Baden, they were third cousins. And finally through Paul I of Russia, Frederick was a fourth cousin of Ingrid's mother. They married in Stockholm Cathedral on 24 May 1935. Among the wedding guests were the King and Queen of Denmark, the King and Queen of the Belgians and the Crown Prince and Crown Princess of Norway. Her wedding was one of the greatest media events of the day in Sweden in 1935, and received so much attention that the media were criticised for it.  Ingrid also appeared on the radio in 1935 and read a poem, something which was also given much attention.

Crown Princess

While she was Crown Princess, she was the official patron of the Girl Guides (1936), after having taken, and passed, the same tests all applicants were given. In 1940, before the occupation, she was the leader of the Danske Kvinders Beredskab (The Danish Women's war-effort society). During the German occupation of Denmark in World War II, Ingrid, with her personal courage and integrity, influenced the Danish Royal House and its conduct in relation to the occupation forces, and won great popularity as a symbol of silent resistance and public patriotic moral. She showed solidarity toward the Danish population, and could often be seen on her bicycle or with her baby carriage on the streets of Copenhagen during the war. Her open defiance of the occupation forces made her grandfather, King Gustav of Sweden, worry about the risks, and in 1941, he sent a demand to her to be more discreet "for the sake of the dynasty" and its safety, but she reacted with anger and refused to obey, and she had the support of her spouse, who shared her views. One display of defiance shown by Ingrid was her positioning of the flags of Denmark, Sweden and the United Kingdom in the window of the nursery at Amalienborg, the royal residence in the centre of Copenhagen.

Queen consort

Upon her husband's accession to the throne on 20 April 1947, she became the Queen of Denmark. As such, she reformed the traditions of Danish court life, abolished many old-fashioned customs at court and created a more relaxed atmosphere at official receptions. She was interested in gardening and art, and renovated the Gråsten Slot according to her own historical research about the palace's original appearance.

Queen mother

In 1972, King Frederick IX died, and Ingrid was widowed at the age of 61. Her elder daughter, aged 31, became the new queen, and Ingrid now assumed a position as family matriarch. That same year, after having sworn to respect the Danish constitution, she was appointed Rigsforstander (formal Regent) and representative of the monarch whenever her daughter (and later her grandsons) were absent, a task she performed on many occasions. This was exceptional; since the constitution of 1871, only the Crown Prince had been allowed to act as regent in the absence of the monarch.

She was patron of a long line of social organizations, positions which, one after another, she eventually left to Princess Benedikte as years passed: Røde Kors, Ældre Sagen, Red Barnet, Løgum Klosters Refugium, and Fonden for Træer og Miljø. She also founded the organizations Kong Frederik og Dronning Ingrids fond til humanitære og kulturelle formål, Ingridfondet for South Jutland, Det kgl. Grønlandsfond, and Dronning Ingrids Romerske Fond til støtte af kulturelle og videnskabelige formål. She was described as dutiful, well-prepared and energetic.

Death

Queen Ingrid died on 7 November 2000 at Fredensborg Palace, Fredensborg, with her three daughters—Queen Margrethe II, Princess Benedikte and Queen Anne-Marie of Greece—and ten grandchildren at her bedside. Thousands gathered outside Amalienborg Palace, her official residence, after her death was announced; flowers were left, candles were lit and hymns were sung in her honour. Her funeral took place on 14 November 2000, and Ingrid was interred next to her husband, King Frederick IX, outside Roskilde Cathedral near Copenhagen. The funeral was attended by many crowned heads of Europe and other heads of state, among them the King and Queen of Sweden, the Queen of Spain, the Queen of the Netherlands, the King and Queen of Norway, the King and Queen of the Belgians, the Grand Duke and Grand Duchess of Luxembourg, the Prince of Wales, the Hereditary Prince of Monaco, the then President of Iceland Ólafur Ragnar Grímsson and former President of Finland Mauno Koivisto.

Issue
Queen Ingrid and King Frederick IX have three daughters, ten grandchildren and twenty-one great-grandchildren.

Margrethe II of Denmark (born 16 April 1940) she married Henri de Laborde de Monpezat on 10 June 1967. They have two sons and eight grandchildren.
Princess Benedikte of Denmark (born 29 April 1944) she married Prince Richard of Sayn-Wittgenstein-Berleburg on 3 February 1968. They have three children and four grandchildren.
Queen Anne-Marie of Greece (born 30 August 1946) she married King Constantine II of Greece on 18 September 1964. They have five children and nine grandchildren.

Honours

National

 : Member Grand Cross of the Royal Order of the Seraphim (LoK av KMO)
 : Member of the Royal Family Order of King Gustav V
 : Member of the Royal Family Order of King Gustav VI Adolf
 : Member of the Royal Family Order of King Carl XVI Gustaf
 : Recipient of 50th Birthday Badge Medal of King Carl XVI Gustaf
 : Recipient of 90th Birthday Badge Medal of King Gustav V
 : Knight Grand Cross with Collar of the Order of the Elephant (R.E.)
 : Knight Grand Commander of the Order of the Dannebrog (S.Kmd.)
 : Dame of the Royal Family Order of King Christian X
 : Dame of the Royal Family Order of King Frederick IX
 : Recipient of the Danish Red Cross Badge of Honor (D.r.K.H.)
 : Recipient of the Medal of the 100th Anniversary of the Birth of King Frederik IX
 : Recipient of the Silver Jubilee Medal of Queen Margrethe II
 : Recipient of the Silver Anniversary Medal of Queen Margrethe II and Prince Henrik
 : Recipient of the 50th Birthday Medal of Queen Margrethe II
 : Recipient of the King Christian X Memorial Medal

Foreign
 : Grand Cross, 1st Class of the Order of Honour for Services to the Republic of Austria
 : Dame Grand Cross of the Order of Leopold I
  Egyptian Royal Family: Dame Grand Cross of the Order of the Virtues, Supreme Class
  Ethiopian Imperial Family: Dame Grand Officer of the Order of the Queen of Sheba
 : Grand Cross with Collar of the Order of the White Rose of Finland
 : Grand Cross of the Legion of Honour
  Greek Royal Family: Dame Grand Cross of the Order of Saints Olga and Sophia
 : Grand Cross, Special Class of the Order of Merit of the Federal Republic of Germany
 : Grand Cross of the Order of the Falcon
  Iranian Imperial Family: Dame Grand Cordon, Special Class of the Imperial Order of the Pleiades
  Iranian Imperial Family: Recipient of the Commemorative Medal of the 2,500 year Celebration of the Persian Empire
 : Grand Cross of the Order of Merit of the Italian Republic
 : Recipient of the For Church and Pope Badge Medal
 : Dame Grand Cross of the Order of Adolphe of Nassau
 : Dame Grand Cross of the Order of the Netherlands Lion
 : Dame Grand Cross of the Order of St. Olav
 : Dame Grand Cross of the Order of Isabella the Catholic
 : Dame Grand Cordon with Chain of the Order of the Royal House of Chakri
  Tunisian Royal Family: Dame Grand Cross of the Order of the Fundamental Pact
 : Recipient of the King George VI Coronation Medal

Arms

Ancestry

References

Citations

Bibliography

 
 
  (In Danish)
 Staffan Skott: Alla dessa Bernadottar (All of the Bernadottes) (1996) (In Swedish)

External links

 Queen Ingrid at the website of the Royal Danish Collection at Amalienborg Palace
 Queen Ingrid Exhibition at the Royal Danish Collection at Amalienborg Palace
 Obituary in The Telegraph, 8 November 2000

1910 births
2000 deaths
People from Stockholm
Danish royal consorts
House of Bernadotte
Queen mothers
Ingrid 1910
Burials at Roskilde Cathedral
Danish people of Swedish descent
Danish princesses
Danish feminists
Crown Princesses of Denmark
Swedish Lutherans
Grand Commanders of the Order of the Dannebrog
Grand Croix of the Légion d'honneur
Knights Grand Cross of the Order of the Falcon
Knights Grand Cross of the Order of Merit of the Italian Republic
Grand Crosses Special Class of the Order of Merit of the Federal Republic of Germany
Dames Grand Cross of the Order of Isabella the Catholic
Recipients of the Grand Star of the Decoration for Services to the Republic of Austria
Swedish emigrants to Denmark
Naturalised citizens of Denmark
Daughters of kings
Recipients of orders, decorations, and medals of Ethiopia